Antenor de Veras Nascentes (1886–1972) was a Brazilian philologist, etymologist, and lexicographer. He wrote the first etymological dictionary of Brazil. He also had an interest in dialect and experimental phonetics. He did analysis of popular speech in Rio de Janeiro in 1922. In 1962 he won the Prêmio Machado de Assis.

References 

1886 births
1972 deaths
Brazilian philologists
Brazilian lexicographers
Brazilian grammarians
Linguists of Portuguese
20th-century philologists
20th-century lexicographers